Vilémovice is a municipality and village in Blansko District in the South Moravian Region of the Czech Republic. It has about 300 inhabitants.

Geography
It lies in the Drahany Highlands.

Vilémovice lies in the Moravian Karst Protected Landscape Area. The Macocha Gorge, the deepest sinkhole of its kind in Central Europe, is located in the municipal territory.

History
The first written mention of Vilémovice is from 1267.

Notable people
František Ševčík (1942–2017), ice hockey player

References

External links

 

Villages in Blansko District